Surinder Pal Singh Sibia is an Indian politician, and a member of Indian National Congress. He served as MLA of Sangrur from 2007 to 2012. He contested from Sangrur in 1997, 2007, and 2012, while twice (2002 and 2017) from Barnala. Sibia has also served as vice-president of Punjab Pradesh Congress Committee. Sibia joined Shiromani Akali Dal in 2016 ahead of 2017 assembly elections, and contested from Barnala. In 2019, he rejoined Congress in presence of then Punjab Chief Minister Amarinder Singh.

References 

Indian politicians
People from Punjab, India
Year of birth missing (living people)
Living people
Punjab, India MLAs 2007–2012